Maurice Harold Hunter (5 March 1904 – 31 October 1987) was an Australian rules football player who played in the Victorian Football League (VFL) between 1929 and 1933 for the Richmond Football Club.

Football
Prior to joining Richmond he played in four premiership teams with St Patrick's of Albury (NSW) between 1923 and 1928. In 1928 he kicked 19 goals in a semi-final against Wangaratta in the Ovens & Murray Football League.

He was a premiership player in 1932 and the clubs best and fairest in 1933. 

In 1934 he was captain / coach of Camberwell in the VFA for the first part of the season, until Horrie Mason took over from Hunter after seven games. Hunter then left Camberwell in July, 1934 to play with Richmond Districts FC in the Melbourne Sub Districts Football Association.

He later coached the Richmond YCW Under 16 team to six premierships between 1940 and 1950.

Death
he died at Fitzroy, Victoria on 31 October 1987.

Notes

References 
 Hogan P: The Tigers Of Old, Richmond FC, (Melbourne), 1996.

External links
 
 Maurie Hunter, at The VFA Project.
 1929 - M Hunter Caricature

1904 births
1987 deaths
Australian rules footballers from New South Wales
Richmond Football Club players
Richmond Football Club Premiership players
Camberwell Football Club players
Camberwell Football Club coaches
One-time VFL/AFL Premiership players